This is a list of members of the Western Australian Legislative Council from 22 May 1980 to 21 May 1983. The chamber had 32 seats made up of 16 provinces each electing two members, on a system of rotation whereby one-half of the members would retire at each triennial election.

Notes
 On 16 December 1981, South Metropolitan Province Labor MLC Howard Olney resigned in order to be appointed to the Supreme Court of Western Australia. Labor candidate Garry Kelly won the resulting by-election on 13 March 1982.
 On 21 May 1982, North Province MLC Bill Withers, who had been elected as a Liberal but had resigned from the party in May 1981, resigned. Labor candidate Tom Stephens won the resulting by-election on 31 July 1982.

Sources
 
 
 
 

Members of Western Australian parliaments by term